Alexander Frank Bell (né Alexander Edward Belli; August 12, 1915 – February 3, 1986), also known as Frank Bell, was an American football player and coach.  He served as the head football coach at Villanova University from 1960 to 1966. He compiled a record of 35–30 and took the Wildcats to two bowl games—the 1961 Sun Bowl and 1962 Liberty Bowl.  Villanova won the Sun Bowl, 17–9, over Wichita, but lost the Liberty Bowl, 6–0, against Oregon State.

Biography
Bell was a native of New Kensington, Pennsylvania. He played college football at Villanova from 1935 to 1937 as an end. Three years later he played for one season (1940) for the Detroit Lions of the National Football League (NFL) as a halfback. He served in the U.S. Navy during World War II from 1942 to 1945.

Head coaching record

College

References

1915 births
1986 deaths
American football ends
Detroit Lions players
Harvard Crimson football coaches
Loyola Lions football coaches
Villanova Wildcats football coaches
Villanova Wildcats football players
National Football League scouts
High school football coaches in California
High school football coaches in Pennsylvania
People from New Kensington, Pennsylvania
Players of American football from Pennsylvania